D220 is a state road in the central Dalmatia region of Croatia that connects the A1 motorway's Bisko interchange to the D60 state road, facilitating access from A1 motorway to Imotski via D60 state road and to Kamensko border crossing to Livno, Bosnia and Herzegovina.

The southern part of the road, is executed as a four-lane expressway, comprising A1 motorway junction and an interchange providing access to Ž6260 county road which runs parallel to the A1 motorway. In the central part of the road, between Čaporice and Trilj, D220 and D60 are concurrent.

The road, as well as all other state roads in Croatia, is managed and maintained by Hrvatske ceste, state owned company.

Traffic volume 

Traffic is regularly counted and reported by Hrvatske ceste, operator of the road. Substantial variations between annual (AADT) and summer (ASDT) traffic volumes are attributed to the fact that the road serves as a connection to A1 motorway carrying substantial tourist traffic.

Road junctions

Sources

See also
 Hrvatske autoceste

State roads in Croatia
Transport in Split-Dalmatia County